Muzzano may refer to:

Places
Italy
Muzzano, Piedmont, a comune in the Province of Biella

Switzerland
Muzzano, Switzerland, a comune in the Canton of Ticino